Ornarantia contubernalis is a moth in the family Choreutidae. It was described by Zeller in 1877.

References

Natural History Museum Lepidoptera generic names catalog

Choreutidae
Moths described in 1877